S. K. Vedarathinam (தமிழ் : எஸ். கே. வேதரத்தினம்) is an Indian politician and former Member of the Legislative Assembly of Tamil Nadu. He was elected to the Tamil Nadu legislative assembly as a Dravida Munnetra Kazhagam candidate from Vedaranyam constituency in 1996, 2001, 2006 elections. He won 3 consecutive elections in Vedaranyam constituency. Later he joined BJP and is a former nation executive member of BJP |2011 election]]. He is one among the 11 State secretaries of BJP, Tamilnadu during his involvement with BJP. He again joined DMK on 22.07.2020 with his followers. He was National General Council member of BJP at the time he joined back to DMK in 2020.

References 

Dravida Munnetra Kazhagam politicians
Living people
Year of birth missing (living people)